Rezza Gaznavi (born 15 October 1992) is a Singaporean cricketer. He played in the 2014 ICC World Cricket League Division Three tournament. In August 2018, he was named in Singapore's squad for the 2018 Asia Cup Qualifier tournament. In October 2018, he was named in Singapore's squad for the 2018 ICC World Cricket League Division Three tournament in Oman.

In July 2019, he was named in Singapore's Twenty20 International (T20I) squad for the Regional Finals of the 2018–19 ICC T20 World Cup Asia Qualifier tournament. In September 2019, he was named in Singapore's squad for the 2019 Malaysia Cricket World Cup Challenge League A tournament. He made his List A debut for Singapore, against Qatar, in the Cricket World Cup Challenge League A tournament on 17 September 2019. In October 2019, he was named in Singapore's squad for the 2019 ICC T20 World Cup Qualifier tournament in the United Arab Emirates. He made his Twenty20 International (T20I) debut for Singapore, against Kenya, on 23 October 2019.

References

External links
 

1992 births
Living people
Singaporean cricketers
Singapore Twenty20 International cricketers
Southeast Asian Games gold medalists for Singapore
Southeast Asian Games silver medalists for Singapore
Southeast Asian Games medalists in cricket
Competitors at the 2017 Southeast Asian Games
Singaporean sportspeople of Indian descent